"House Party" is a song by American recording artist Meek Mill, released as the first single from his mixtape Dreamchasers, the first mixtape he released since signing to Maybach Music Group, and is the first installment of his Dreamchasers series. It features fellow Philadelphia rapper and State Property member Young Chris. It was also produced by The Beat Bully.

Music video
On December 11, 2011, the music video, directed by Dre Films, was released on MTV2. Cameo appearances are made by Rick Ross, French Montana, DJ Drama, Lil Duval and Twista.

Remix
The official remix was included as the seventeenth track on Meek Mill's later mixtape, Dreamchasers 2, the second installment in his Dreamchasers series. It features rappers Fabolous, Wale and Mac Miller.

Track listing
 Digital single

Charts

Certifications

References

2011 songs
2011 singles
Meek Mill songs
Maybach Music Group singles
Warner Records singles
Songs written by Meek Mill
Songs written by Young Chris